Mahek is an Indian children's film by writer-director Kranti Kanade.

Synopsis 
It's about 11-yr old dreamer Mahek who wants to be the best at everything, but is unsure of how to achieve her goals.

Production

Development 
The film was produced by the Children's Film Society of India (CFSI).

Crew 
Legendary artist and cartoonist Mario Miranda did the illustrations for the film. The crew was FTII alumnus who subsequently did notable work. Mrinal Desai, the DOP, was the second unit director of photography on 'Slumdog Millionaire' and later shot universally acclaimed film 'Court'. Editor Suchitra Sathe and Sound designer Anmol Bhave worked on National Award-winning films.

Release 
It premiered at the BFI London Film Festival to affectionate reviews. Invited to over twenty International film festivals including Chicago, Munich, Toronto, St Louis and Cleveland, it won awards in Hollywood and Houston. It was Best Children's film nominee at the Asia Pacific Screen Awards, Australia and was shown as part of "Modern India" studies syllabus at the  Otterbein University.

Reviews 
This film received positive with British Film Institute terming it as "An inspiring family film from India". The Sprockets Toronto Film Festival noted that "The film celebrates imagination, self-confidence and perseverance." One of India's most respected critics Maithili Rao, in the Frontline (magazine) said that the film was  "A rare combination of sensitivity and gentle humour". Similarly, Rachel Dwyer, University of London termed the film as "Totally delightful". Cleveland Film Festival, USA noted it a "Gem of a film". St.Louis Film Festival, USA described Mahek as a "Beautifully filmed with a nice eye for color and very funny", whereas the Syracuse New Times, New York applauded that the film "Certainly matches Truffaut’s cinematic spirit."

Mahek has been included in the curriculum of Otterbein College, one of the oldest universities in the US.

Outlook - A new filmmaker on the horizon
Indian Express - Imagery of childhood 
Mahek's first screening in India 
Interview with Kranti Kanade 
Indian children's film win accolades in Houston

References 

Indian children's films
2000s Hindi-language films
2007 films
2000s children's films